is a passenger railway station located in the city of Kōchi, the capital of Kōchi Prefecture, Japan. It is operated by JR Shikoku and has the station number "K01".

Lines

Layout
The station, which is unstaffed, consists of a side platform serving a single elevated track. There is no station building, only a shelter on the platform for waiting passengers and a ticket vending machine. There is an elevator from street level to the platform for barrier-free access. Parking for bikes is available under the elevated track and for cars across the street.

History
The station was opened on 15 December 1961 by Japanese National Railways (JNR) as a new stop along the existing Dosan Line. With the privatization of JNR on 1 April 1987, control of the station passed to JR Shikoku. In 2008, it was rebuilt and opened as an elevated station as part of a project to elevate  Station and 4.1 km of nearby tracks to improve traffic circulation in the city.

Surrounding area
Kochi Prefectural Kochi Ozu High School
Kōchi Castle

See also
List of railway stations in Japan

References

External links

timestable 

Railway stations in Kōchi Prefecture
Railway stations in Japan opened in 1961
Kōchi